The Milano–Chiasso railway line is an Italian state-owned railway connecting Milan to Como and Chiasso, Switzerland.

It is electrified at 3000 volts DC. Between Milan and Monza it has four tracks and is used not only by trains operating to and from Como, but also by freight and passenger trains connecting Milan with Bergamo and Lecco, either directly or routed via Molteno. North of Monza it has two tracks, but between the junction "Bivio Rosales" and Chiasso there is a parallel double track line (used mainly by freight trains) including Monte Olimpino 2 tunnel (7207 m).

History
The first section of the line is the Milan–Monza line, which was opened by the Kingdom of Lombardy-Venetia (part  of the Austrian Empire) as the Imperiale Regia Privilegiata Strada Ferrata da Milano a Monza ("Imperial Royal Privileged Railway from Milan to Monza") on 18 August 1840, the second railway opened in Italy after the Naples–Portici railway line. The government originally intended to permit the line to be extended to Bergamo, but had intended that a separate concession be granted for a line from Milan to Como. Instead, it decided to scale down the project by allowing the Monza line to be extended to Como. On 10 October 1849 line was opened from Monza to Camnago in Lentate sul Seveso and it was extended to Camerlata on 6 December. The line was completed to Como in 1875. It was part of the Società per le strade ferrate dell'Alta Italia (Upper Italian Railways) from 1865, the Società per le Strade Ferrate del Mediterraneo (Mediterranean Railway Company) from 1885 and Ferrovie dello Stato from 1905.

Services
Since 14 December 2008 suburban services on this line between Como and Milano Porta Garibaldi have been operated hourly by Trenitalia as line S11 of the Milan Suburban Railway Network. From 12 December 2004 regional passenger trains had been operated by TiLo ("Treni Regionali Ticino Lombardia", a joint venture of Ferrovie dello Stato and Swiss Federal Railways). Line S9 operates between Seregno and Milano San Cristoforo via the ring railway. Camnago-Lentate station is the northern terminus of line S4, using the Camnago–Seveso link of the Milan–Asso line, and provides a link to Milan Cadorna station and the lines of Ferrovie Nord Milano (FNM). There are some peak hours trains without a regular interval timetable. In 2006 integrated ticketing and subscriptions allowing travel using a single ticket on trains of both LeNord (FNM passenger services) and TiLo were introduced to facilitate rail traffic between Brianza and Milan.

The line is also used by long-distance Eurocity trains to and from Basel and Zurich.

The line is used by many railway companies to transport goods to and from Switzerland and northern Europe.

References

Footnotes

Sources

See also 
 List of railway lines in Italy

International railway lines
Railway lines in Lombardy
Railway lines in Switzerland
Railway lines opened in 1876